Tregnago is a comune (municipality) in the Province of Verona in the Italian region Veneto, located about  west of Venice and about  northeast of Verona.

Tregnago borders the following municipalities: Badia Calavena, Cazzano di Tramigna, Illasi, Mezzane di Sotto, San Giovanni Ilarione, San Mauro di Saline, Verona, and Vestenanova.

Twin towns
Tregnago is twinned with:

  Ollolai, Italy, since 2002

References

External links
 Official website

Cities and towns in Veneto